The Davis Island Lock and Dam Site on the Ohio river in Avalon, Pennsylvania, is the site of the former Davis Island lock that was completed in 1885.

The lock and dam existed from 1878 to 1922, designed by William Emery Merrill and the U.S. Army Corps of Engineers.  The Davis Island Lock and Dam was the first dam that was constructed on the Ohio River. It officially opened on October 7, 1885, with a large dedication ceremony.  The Davis Island Dam was the largest Chanoine dam built in the 19th century, and one of the first concrete structures built by the Army Corps of Engineers.  It was the first of 51 Chanoine type dams that were built by the Corps of Engineers between 1878 and 1929.

The dam was dismantled in 1922, when it was replaced by the Emsworth Locks and Dam less than a mile downstream of the original site.  It was listed on the National Register of Historic Places on August 29, 1980 and designated as a National Historic Civil Engineering Landmark by the American Society of Civil Engineers in 1985.

It is now owned by the West View Water Authority and is used primarily to pump water from the Ohio River, which then goes on to be purified and is used by the surrounding communities for drinking.

References

External links

National Register of Historic Places in Allegheny County, Pennsylvania
Buildings and structures in Allegheny County, Pennsylvania
Locks on the National Register of Historic Places in Pennsylvania
Historic American Engineering Record in Pennsylvania
Dams in Pennsylvania
Dams completed in 1885
United States Army Corps of Engineers dams
Dams on the National Register of Historic Places in Pennsylvania
Transportation buildings and structures in Allegheny County, Pennsylvania
United States Army Corps of Engineers, Pittsburgh District
Historic Civil Engineering Landmarks